The governor of Occidental Mindoro is the executive head of the province of Occidental Mindoro. The inaugural holder of the post is Federico Castillo.

List

References

Occidental Mindoro
Occidental Mindoro